Vinayaka Temple or Sri Varasidhi Vinayaka Swamy Temple is a Hindu temple of Ganesha. It is located at Kanipakam in Chittoor district of Andhra Pradesh, India. The temple is about 11 km from Chittoor and 68 km from Tirupati.

Legend
According to legend, there were three brothers who were mute, deaf and blind. They were digging a well to fetch water to their field. The device they were using fell into the well hitting hard object. When they dug further, blood started to gush out of the well and the three got rid of their disabilities. The villagers rushed to the spot and found deity of Ganesha. Villagers dug further, but they were not able to find the base of the deity. The deity sits in the well which is always full of water.

History
The temple was constructed in the early 11th century CE by the Chola king Kulothunga Chola I and was expanded further in 1336 by the Emperors of Vijayanagara dynasty.

Presiding deity

Vinayaka is the presiding deity of the temple. As per legend, it is believed that the deity is Svayambhu(Self-manifested). The deity is seen in the well, full of water always.

Administration
The temple is under the control of Endowments department of Andhra Pradesh which will appoint a trust board of 15 members to administer the temple.

Festivals
Annual brahmotsavams will be celebrated for 21 days starting from Vinayaka chavithi day. The processional deity of Vinayaka will be taken in a procession on different vahanams on these days amidst large number of pilgrims across the country.

References

External links

 Official site

Ganesha temples
Hindu temples in Chittoor district
11th-century Hindu temples